CBTA (Centro de Bachillerato Tecnologico Agropecuario is a chain of Mexican high schools (known in Mexico as ) which offers programs to upgrade the regular degree to a technical-professional level. CBTA has campuses in 31 states.

All CBTA jointly with all CBTF high schools are part of the technical school of the DGETA, and are dependent of Secretaría de Educación Pública of Mexico.

Location
There are 308 CBTAs in Mexico.

See also
 CBTIS (Centro de Bachillerato Tecnológico Industrial y de Servicios)
 CEB (Centro de Estudios de Bachillerato)
 CETAC (Centro de Estudios Tecnológicos en Aguas Continentales)
 CETIS (Centro de Estudios Tecnológicos Industrial y de Servicios)
 CETMAR (Centro de Estudios Tecnológicos del Mar)
 PFLC (Preparatoria Federal Lázaro Cárdenas)
 PREFECO (Preparatoria Federal por Cooperación)

References

External links
DGETA

High schools in Mexico